The 12991 / 12992 Udaipur City–Jaipur Intercity Express is an Intercity Express train belonging to Indian Railways – North Western Railway zone that runs between Udaipur City and  in India.

It operates as train number 12991 from Udaipur City to Jaipur and as train number 12992 in the reverse direction serving the state of Rajasthan.

Coaches

The 12991 / 92 Udaipur City–Jaipur Intercity Express has 1 First Class, 2 AC Chair Car, 2 Second Class seating, 11 General Unreserved & 2 SLR (Seating cum Luggage Rake) coaches. It does not carry a pantry car.

As is customary with most train services in India, coach composition may be amended at the discretion of Indian Railways depending on demand.

Service

As the average speed of the train is above , as per Indian Railways rules, its fare includes a Superfast surcharge.

Routing

The 12991 / 92 Udaipur City–Jaipur Express runs from Udaipur City via Mavli Junction, Chittaurgarh, Ajmer Junction to Jaipur.

It reverses direction of travel at Chittaurgarh.

Traction

As large sections of the route are yet to be fully electrified, an Abu Road-based WDM-2A or WDM-3A locomotive powers the train for its entire journey.

Operation

12991 Udaipur City–Jaipur Intercity Express leaves Udaipur City on a daily basis and reaches Jaipur the same day.

12992 Jaipur–Udaipur City Intercity Express leaves Jaipur on a daily basis and reaches Udaipur City the same day.

References 

 https://www.google.co.in/search?q=udaipur+city+jaipur+express&tbm=isch&tbo=u&source=univ&sa=X&ei=ol6yU-PJL4Pl8AWB7YL4DA&ved=0CEgQsAQ&biw=1280&bih=699
 https://www.youtube.com/watch?v=wdT51JYrb2M

External links

Transport in Jaipur
Transport in Udaipur
Rail transport in Rajasthan
Intercity Express (Indian Railways) trains
Express trains in India